Led Zeppelin: The Biography is a biography of the English rock band Led Zeppelin written by Bob Spitz. It was published on 9 November 2021 by Penguin Books.

References

External links 
 WorldCat entry

2021 non-fiction books
Led Zeppelin
Biographies about musicians
Books about rock musicians
Penguin Press books